Bryn Mawr School, founded in 1885 as the first college-preparatory school for girls in the United States, is an independent, nonsectarian all-girls school for grades PK-12, with a coed preschool. Bryn Mawr School is located in the Roland Park community of Baltimore, Maryland, United States at 109 W. Melrose Avenue, Baltimore MD 21210.

Bryn Mawr School Community
In 2007–2008, Bryn Mawr had 117 faculty members, 61% of whom held advanced degrees. Student enrollment was 784 and the student to faculty ratio is 7:1. The average class size is 15.  Boys are admitted only into the pre-school division known as the Little School; however, students from Bryn Mawr's brother school may take classes once in Upper School. Each student in the Middle and Upper Schools is assigned an Advisor in her division who serves as her representative to the school.  Advisory groups meet together throughout the week for discussions and celebrations, and work together on a variety of charitable and service projects.

History

The Bryn Mawr School for Girls of Baltimore City was founded in 1885 by five young Baltimore women, M. Carey Thomas, Mary Elizabeth Garrett, Mamie Gwinn, Bessie King, and Julia Rogers, collectively known as the "Friday Evening" Group, who sought to provide an education for girls equal to that available to boys.  Their families were involved in the creation of the Bryn Mawr College in Pennsylvania, of which M. Carey Thomas was to be first dean and later president.  In her 1883 letter to James E. Rhoads (the first president of the college), M. Carey Thomas shared her concern for how they would find young women prepared for the unprecedented rigorous standards of the new college: "The absence of the regularly organized preparatory schools that exist for boys greatly embarrasses a girl who means to enter college."  The school that these young women created in Baltimore was the first to offer only a college preparatory program.  They set their standards high, insisting upon a well-educated faculty which was predominantly female and a curriculum that required Latin and French, German and Greek, laboratory sciences, history, literature, advanced mathematics, elocution, and art.  The students underwent examinations by professors from leading universities including Johns Hopkins and Cornell, and to graduate had to pass the exceedingly difficult entrance exam for the Bryn Mawr College.

Mary Elizabeth Garrett, who became the wealthiest “spinster woman” in the country with the death of her father John Work Garrett, was the benefactress of this experiment in education.  She was often onsite during the construction of a unique school building in downtown Baltimore from 1888 to 1890, which cost her the immense sum of $400,000.  It featured an indoor swimming pool complete with cold “needle baths”, a gymnasium with suspended track and outfitted with the most modern gymnasium equipment from Sweden and the Sargent School of Boston, as well as a full-time physician to oversee the athletic and posture programs.  Up the many flights of stairs were complete scientific laboratories, an art room flooded with natural light by skylights, and a library stocked with classics and modern literature as well as scientific and mathematical volumes.  The large study hall bore a complete copy of the Parthenon Frieze and there were copies of European and American statuary and artwork throughout the building for the girls to study and draw.  The building was so intriguing that a model of it was made for the Columbian Exposition of 1893 in Chicago and numerous articles about it appeared in newspapers across the country.  Women who had reached the highest levels of academic achievement wrote to the founders offering their support and enthusiasm, as well as recommendations for faculty from among their own students.  The school was seen as a move forward for women's education reaching far beyond Baltimore and Pennsylvania.

After a series of Secretaries who managed the daily running of the school, the Board of Managers brought Edith Hamilton from her doctoral studies in Europe to be the first Headmistress.  A gifted graduate of the Bryn Mawr College and winner of the European Scholarship, Edith Hamilton guided the school for 26 years, from 1896 to 1922.  Her love of learning was infectious and the girls worked hard to earn her praise; many later quoted her favorite from Plato, "Hard is the good".  The school still bears the stamp of humanism and intellectual curiosity that she instilled.

As the city became more congested and families moved out to the country, there was an urgent need to move the school as well.  The  property known as The Orchards was purchased in 1928 from the Gordon family north of the city line, and the school spent several years acquiring the funds to gradually move out of its home downtown and into renovated and new buildings in the country.  The Depression and then the Second World War made it difficult to sell the former school building to the eventual buyers, the German Singing Societies, but the Alumnae and the Parents Associations worked dutifully to raise funds for the needs of modern education.  Over the years buildings have been added as needed.  The same stone that had been used to build the Gatehouse in the 19th century was found at the Butler quarry in Baltimore County and was used in the construction of Garrett (1931), Hamilton (1953), and the North Building (2007).  Other structures built of complementary materials include Howell (1969) which houses the Upper School and the Edith Hamilton Library, Hardy (1969) for science and math, the Cafeteria (1948), Katherine Van Bibber Gymnasium (1959), the Lower School complex designed by Marcel Breuer (1972), Centennial Hall (1987), the Barbara Landis Chase Dance Studio (1992), the Lower School Science building (1996), the Admissions Cottage (1997), and a variety of small outbuildings and additions.  Many of these structures have been recognized for excellence in design.

Academics
Coordination of classes with the adjacent boys' school at Gilman School and girls' school at Roland Park Country School at the Upper School level offers Bryn Mawr students a variety of electives and the opportunity for coeducational classes. These coordinated classes are concentrated in the junior and senior years.

Most students take two years of Latin and three years of either French or Spanish in Middle School.  They often continue one or both in the Upper School and have the option of following a double language track. Offerings in other foreign languages including Chinese, Arabic, Russian, and Greek begin in the ninth grade and are usually coordinated with Gilman and Roland Park.

Graduation Requirements:  Arts and fine arts (art, music, dance, drama), intro to computer science, English, foreign language, history, mathematics, physical education (includes health), public speaking, science, 50 hours of community service, and a convocation speech.

Athletics

On November 25, 1901, Bryn Mawr and St. Timothy's School began what is believed to be the longest continuous girls' high school basketball rivalry in the country, with a silver cup dedicated to the game passed between the schools.  The game was quite different from basketball today, played nine on nine on a court divided into three sections, with groups of three in each section.  The uniforms were high-collared white blouses over heavy corduroy skirts that came almost to the ground, black stockings and white athletic shoes. The game was played outdoors without a backboard, on a dirt field which would be covered with straw to absorb dampness if necessary.  The headmistresses of both schools agreed to a list of rules and conditions, which included prohibiting male spectators (with the exception of William Marston, the Headmaster of Marston School who officiated the game) and guaranteed that none of the girls' names would be published in the newspapers, considered unseemly at the start of the 20th century. The game was finally moved inside in 1928 as interest in field hockey as an outdoor fall sport grew. In December 2011, the two schools played a game in the old-fashioned cloths and rules to remember the first game played between the two schools.

In 1926 Rosabelle Sinclair established the first American women's lacrosse team at The Bryn Mawr School, bringing the Native American game to the United States from St Leonards School in Scotland (where it had arrived from Canada). In 1992 she was the first woman inducted into the National Lacrosse Hall of Fame.  The first game was held against Friends School of Baltimore. Since 1999, Bryn Mawr has shared Norris Field with the Mount Washington Lacrosse Club, one of the most successful amateur lacrosse teams in history.

The athletics program today provides a wide range of offerings for competitive play including cross country, track, volleyball, basketball, softball, crew, squash, ice hockey, swimming, and dance.  There are 17 sports in the Upper School available on the varsity and junior varsity levels,  and 13 sports at the Middle School level.

Cross Country, Indoor Track, and Outdoor Track showed great improvement during the 2008–2009 year.  For the first time in years, track (both indoor and outdoor) managed to place very well on average in meets. This was done under the instruction of Coach Paul Vece and other assistant coaches. In 2010, the Bryn Mawr Ice Hockey team won their first championship, finally defeating Holton Arms. The varsity soccer team, led by Coach Tina Steck, won three back-to-back IAAM championships in 2009, 2010 and 2011.

Like many of the other private schools in Baltimore, Bryn Mawr has a brother and sister school. Bryn Mawr's brother school is Gilman. These two schools are located across the street from each other. Bryn Mawr's sister school (as well as rival school) is the Roland Park Country School (RPCS). The three schools coordinate Upper School classes so that students may attend a wider variety of classes and so that they may interact with their peers at other schools.

Roland Park is an all-girls school that is considered a rival to Bryn Mawr, especially when it comes to athletics. Twice an academic year, once in the fall and once in the spring, RPCS and Bryn Mawr hold Spirit Weeks, during which the two schools play games against each other in sports such as field hockey and lacrosse. During the school days of these weeks, students wear costumes in addition to the uniform skirt. Each day of the week has a theme. For instance, if the theme is tropical, then students wear leis, Hawaiian shirts and such. On the final day of Spirit Week, the theme is always school spirit. The RPCS 'Reds' wear red and the Bryn 'Mawrtians' wear green and yellow.

Traditions

 Founders Day:  On a day in late September/early October, the entire school gathers in the morning in the Graduation Garden to celebrate the founding of the School in 1885.  Faculty and staff awards are presented for recognition of outstanding service to the community.
 Bazaar: The Bazaar, begun in 1948 by the Parent's Association, is held on the first Saturday of May and includes activities for all the members of the school community including games, rides, and markets.
 Gym Drill: After the Bazaar, the Bryn Mawr community gathers at the upper athletic field for Gym Drill.  The Middle and Upper School perform an all-school dance and school exercises which have been performed since 1904, followed by each class in the Middle and Upper Schools performing an ethnic dance. In addition, the seniors perform a dance that they have choreographed. Reunion alumnae classes join in the Banner March in which the Gym Drill captain in each class passes down her banner to mark the completion of the year. The Fifth Grade marches onto the field at the end to receive their first banner, marking the end of their Lower School days.
 Bell Ringing: The day before senior projects, each senior rings the bell in the 1992 Belltower with another Bryn Mawr student of her choice (or multiple students).
 Class Day: The day before senior graduation, Grades 7–12 gather for a ceremony to mark the end of the school year.
 Graduation: in early June.

Notable alumnae and faculty

 Bess Armstrong, Class of 1971, actress
 Margaret Barker, Class of 1926, actress (an original member of The Group Theatre, 1931).
 Vashti Bartlett, Red Cross nurse in World War I
 Anne S. K. Brown, military historian
 Nancy L. R. Bucher, cell biologist
 Esther Boise Van Deman, Bryn Mawr School faculty in Classics, archaeologist
 Marcella Boveri, teacher of science 1885-1887
 Gabrielle D. Clements, painter, print maker, and muralist
 Elizabeth Donald, author
 Frances Scott Fitzgerald, writer, journalist, and prominent member of the Democratic Party; the only child of F. Scott Fitzgerald and Zelda Fitzgerald
 Kisha Ford, basketball player
 Mary Elizabeth Garrett, Bryn Mawr School founder, whose philanthropy was also fundamental in the support of Bryn Mawr College and the Johns Hopkins University School of Medicine
 Leonie Gilmour, Class of 1891, writer
 Julia Haller, ophthalmologist
 Edith Hamilton, headmistress 1896–1922, author of The Greek Way (1930)
 Margaret Hamilton, headmistress 1933–1935
 Ethel Browne Harvey, embryologist
 Anna Hiss, 20th-Century professor of physical education
 Kate Campbell Hurd-Mead, pioneering feminist and obstetrician
 Nan Knighton, poet, playwright and lyricist
 Linda Lange, bacteriologist 
 Margo Lion, Class of 1962, award-winning Broadway producer
 Louisa Lumsden, pioneer of female education
 Millicent Carey McIntosh, Class of 1916, headmistress of the Brearley School for 17 years and the first married female president of a Seven Sisters College, serving at Barnard College from 1947 to 1962.
 Ida Martha Metcalf, the second American woman to receive a Ph.D. in mathematics
 Sheila Murnaghan, Class of 1969, classicist
 Heather Murren, businesswoman
 Mildred Natwick, Class of 1924, actress
 Eleanor Phelps, Class of 1924, actress
 Julia Randall, Class of 1941, poet
 Sandra Scarr, psychologist and writer
 Rosabelle Sinclair, who established the first women's lacrosse team in the United States
 Louise L. Sloan, ophthalmologist and vision scientist
 Leslie Crocker Snyder, lawyer and judge
 Nancy Soderberg, Class of 1974, foreign policy strategist and author
 Peggy Speas, Class of 1969, linguist
 Isabelle Stone, physicist and co-founder of American Physical Society
 Marcia Talley, award-winning mystery novelist
 M. Carey Thomas, founder of Bryn Mawr School
 Esther Boise Van Deman, leading archaeologist of the late 19th and early 20th centuries
 Natalie Wexler, Class of 1972, novelist
 Melanie Whelan, Class of 1995, former chief executive officer of SoulCycle

References and notes

External links
 The Bryn Mawr School

Private schools in Baltimore
Private K-12 schools in Maryland
Preparatory schools in Maryland
Educational institutions established in 1885
Middle States Commission on Secondary Schools
Girls' schools in Maryland
Roland Park, Baltimore
1885 establishments in Maryland